Hemipenthes morio is a species of 'bee flies' belonging to the family Bombyliidae subfamily Anthracinae.

This common  'bee-fly' is mainly present in most of Europe, the eastern Palearctic realm, and the Near East.

They can mostly be encountered from May through August feeding on nectar and pollen of a variety of flowers (for instance of Lavandula stoechas, Cytisus scoparius, Thapsia villosa, etc.).

Their body is dark-brown and hairy, especially on the side of the abdomen. The wings have a light area located near the apex and a dark area close to costal margin, separated by a zig-zag division. The apex of cell R1 is hyaline. The dark area of the wings almost reaches the end of the abdomen.

The larvae are hyperparasites (parasites of parasites), mainly developing in larvae of flies (Diptera, Tachinidae), as well as in wasp larvae (Hymenoptera, Ichneumonidae) parasitizing caterpillars moths (Noctuidae).

References
 David K. Yeates; Christine L. Lambkin - The Tree of Life
 Mark van Veen, Zeist - Hemipenthes Keys

External links
 Biolib
 Fauna Europaea 
 Tout un monde
 Days on the claise
 Herramientas

Bombyliidae
Flies described in 1758
Diptera of Europe
Parasites of Diptera
Parasites of Hymenoptera
Hyperparasites
Taxa named by Carl Linnaeus